René Racine  (born 1939) is a French Canadian professor and astronomer who specializes in the study of globular clusters. He has also achieved international renown for his work with galaxies, astronomical instruments and adaptive optics.

Biography
Racine was born in Quebec City. He eventually obtained a bachelor's degree of Physics from Laval University in 1963.  He obtained his master's and doctoral degrees (Ph.D in astronomy) in 1965 and in 1967, respectively, from the University of Toronto. He achieved a research scholarship at the Carnegie Institute.

Between 1967 and 1969, he was Carnegie Fellow at the Mount Wilson and Palomar observatories near Pasadena, California. He then operated the Mt. Mégantic Observatory during the years of 1976–1980, the Canada-France-Hawaii Telescope during 1980–1984, before returning to Mt. Mégantic Observatory for the years of 1984–1997.

In 1994, he with five others, recalibrated the value of the Hubble constant, which helps to measure extragalactic distances, and the size and the age of the Universe.

On 10 February 2000, Denis Bergeron, in Val-des-Bois, was the first to discover an asteroid from Quebec. The asteroid, 45580 Renéracine, was named in honor of Racine.

Racine was a member of the Order of Canada, but on 1 June 2009, he Racine resigned from it to protest Henry Morgentaler's appointment to the Order. Racine remained in the Ordre National du Québec.

Accolades
Price Léon Lortie of Saint-Jean-Baptiste Society of Montreal in 1988.
Member of the Royal Society of Canada in 1989.
Member of the Astronomical Society of the Pacific in 1991.
Beals of the Canadian Astronomical Society in 1992.
Scientist Award of the year by the Canadian Broadcasting Corporation in 1994.
Order of Canada in 1999, resigned the honour in 2009.
Queen Elizabeth II (2002, 1977) Golden Jubilee Medal of Her Majesty.

References

20th-century Canadian astronomers
People from Quebec City
Living people
Members of the Order of Canada
1939 births
Université Laval alumni